The Critics' Choice Movie Award for Best Costume Design is one of the Critics' Choice Movie Awards given to people working in the film industry by the Critics Choice Association. It was first given out in 2010. Only twice (in 2016 and 2019) has it not lined up with the winner of the Academy Award for Best Costume Design.

Winners and nominees

2000s

2010s

2020s

References

External links
 Official website

C
Lists of films by award
Awards established in 2009
Awards for film costume design